The 2017 Panda Cup was the fourth edition of Panda Cup, an under-19 association football competition.

The tournament was hosted in Chengdu between 17 and 21 May. Players born on or after 1 January 1999 are eligible to compete in the tournament.

Participating teams

Venues

Standings

Matches

Goalscorers
3 goals

 Bendegúz Bolla
 Mohammad Sharifi

2 goals

 Mohammad Ghaderi
 Michal Kraľovič

1 goal

 Erpan Ezimjan
 Zhou Junchen
 Zsombor Bévárdi
 Tibor Kisari
 Balázs Kiss
 Levente Lustyik
 Dávid Stoiacovici
 Máté Szabó
 Sayyad Manesh Shiadeh
 Matej Grešák
 Martin Vician

References 

2017 in association football
2017 in Chinese football
May 2017 sports events in China
International association football competitions hosted by China